Several institutions are known as University Medical Center including:

University Medical Center (El Paso, Texas)
University Medical Center (Lebanon, Tennessee)
University Medical Center (Lubbock, Texas)
University Medical Center (Saint Louis, Missouri)
University Medical Center (Tucson, Arizona)
University Medical Center (UTA station)
University Medical Center New Orleans
University Medical Center Utrecht
University Medical Center of Princeton at Plainsboro
University Medical Center of Southern Nevada

Trauma centers